Arnsbach may refer to:

Arnsbach, Borken, a community of the town Borken, Hesse, Germany
Arnsbach (Usa), a river of Hesse, Germany, tributary of the Usa